Interstate 195 (I-195) is an auxiliary Interstate Highway in the US state of Virginia. Known as the Beltline Expressway, the highway runs  from State Route 195 (SR 195), a toll road that continues south into Downtown Richmond, north to I-64 and I-95 on the northern edge of Richmond. I-195 passes through the West End of Richmond and connects I-64 and I-95 with US Route 33 (US 33) and US 250, which follow Broad Street, and with SR 76, a toll road that links Richmond with the Southside of the metropolitan area.

Route description

I-195 begins as a continuation of SR 195 (Downtown Expressway), a toll road that connects I-195 with I-95 in Downtown Richmond. The transition between the Interstate and the state-numbered highway occurs just east of the McCloy Street overpass south of the Carytown district of Richmond. The four-lane freeway gains a pair of lanes just west of the transition where there is a southbound exit ramp for Rosewood Avenue, which leads to City Stadium, and a northbound entrance ramp from Idlewood Avenue. Northbound I-195 has an exit for SR 147 (Cary Street) and Floyd Avenue, while a ramp from SR 147 joins the southbound Interstate as the highway curves north on a pair of two-lane flyover ramps to join the six lanes of SR 76 (Powhite Parkway) that join the Interstate at that toll road's northern terminus.

I-195 continues northeast as a six-lane freeway; its median is occupied by CSX Transportation's two-track North End Subdivision, which is also used by Amtrak. The southbound I-195 has an exit ramp to Hamilton Street, which parallels the highway to the west, to serve SR 147 and Grove Avenue. A short distance to the north, northbound I-195 has exit and entrance ramps to and from Thompson Street, which parallels the Interstate to the east, to access SR 6 (Patterson Avenue) and Grove Avenue. North of Monument Avenue, from which the southbound direction receives a ramp, I-195 has a multipart interchange with Broad Street, which carries US 33 and US 250. The southbound freeway receives a ramp from Hamilton Street, and the northbound freeway has an exit ramp to Clay Street north of the Broad Street overpass. After the overpass, northbound I-195 crosses over the North End Subdivision, and both directions pass under Hamilton Street, with which the freeway has a half diamond interchange that allows access to US 33 and US 250 from the north.

I-195 passes through an industrial area in which the highway crosses over SR 197 (Westwood Avenue) and a railyard of CSX Transportation's RF&P Subdivision just north of its wye junction with the North End Subdivision. While on the viaduct, the Interstate briefly enters Henrico County. North of the S-curved viaduct, I-195 has a three-quarter diamond interchange with the western end of Laburnum Avenue, which provides access to SR 197. The interchange's north-facing ramp is from eastbound I-64 within the Bryan Park Interchange, a three-level stack interchange with multiple flyover ramps where I-195 reaches its northern terminus at I-64 and I-95 south of Bryan Park at the northernmost point in the city of Richmond. Ramps to southbound I-195 converge and ramps from northbound I-195 diverge for westbound I-64 toward Charlottesville, northbound I-95 toward Washington, and eastbound I-64 and southbound I-95 (Richmond–Petersburg Turnpike) toward Downtown Richmond, where the Interstates diverge toward Norfolk and Petersburg, respectively.

History

Exit list

References

External links

Virginia Highways Project: I-195
Roads to the Future: Interstate 195 in Virginia

95-1 Virginia
95-1
1 Virginia
Interstate 195
Interstate 195